Richard Amhurst (c. 1565 – c. 1631) was an English lawyer and politician who sat in the House of Commons between 1614 and 1622.

Amhurst matriculated at St John's College, Oxford on 6 July 1582, aged 17 when he was of Bay Hall in Pembury, Kent, and of Lewes, Sussex. He was called to the bar at Gray's Inn in 1592, and became a bencher of his Inn in 1612. In 1614, he was elected Member of Parliament for Lewes. He was re-elected MP for Lewes in 1621. He went out on 2 August 1623 as serjeant-at-law. He founded the almshouses at Pembury. 
 
Amhurst died between 8 August 1630 when he made his will and 3 May 1632 when it was proved.

References

1560s births
1630s deaths
Alumni of St John's College, Oxford
Members of Gray's Inn
People from Lewes
Year of death uncertain
English MPs 1614
English MPs 1621–1622